The Wairau Affray of 17 June 1843, also called the Wairau Massacre in older histories and the Wairau Incident, was the first serious clash of arms between British settlers and Māori in New Zealand after the signing of the Treaty of Waitangi and the only one to take place in the South Island. The incident was sparked when a magistrate and a representative of the New Zealand Company, who held a possibly fraudulent deed to land in the Wairau Valley in Marlborough in the north of the South Island, led a group of European settlers to attempt to clear Māori off the land and arrest Ngāti Toa chiefs Te Rauparaha and Te Rangihaeata. Fighting broke out and 22 British settlers were killed, nine after their surrender. Four Māori were killed, including Te Rongo, who was Te Rangihaeata's wife and Te Rauparaha's daughter.

The incident heightened fears among settlers of an armed Māori insurrection. It created the first major challenge for Governor Robert FitzRoy, who took up his posting in New Zealand six months later. FitzRoy investigated the incident and exonerated Te Rauparaha and Te Rangihaeata, for which he was strongly criticised by settlers and the New Zealand Company. In 1944 a land claims commission investigation determined that the Wairau Valley had not been legally sold. The government was to pay compensation to the Rangitāne iwi, determined to be the original owners (until the early 1830s, when Te Rauparaha had driven them from the area).

Background

The New Zealand Company had built a settlement around Nelson in the north of the South Island in 1840. It had planned to occupy , but by the end of the year, even as allotments were being sold in England, the company's agents in New Zealand were having difficulty in identifying available land, let alone buying it from local Māori, to form the settlement. The settlers began to purchase large areas of land directly from Māori, without consulting the newly established colonial government and often without establishing vendors' rights to sell the land. The situation led to tension and caused disputes between the parties.

In January 1843 Captain Arthur Wakefield had been dispatched by the New Zealand Company to lead the first group of settlers to Nelson. He was the younger brother of Colonel Edward Gibbon Wakefield, one of the principal officers of the company, and William Wakefield. He said he held a deed to the land, having bought it in 1839 from the widow of a whaling captain, John Blenkinsop, who had married the daughter of Te Rauparaha of the Ngāti Toa iwi. Te Rauparaha had married his daughter Te Rongo to Captain Blenkinsop, who at Tuamarina persuaded him to sign a deed of sale of land in the Wairau Valley for a whaling station. It is unlikely that Te Rauparaha had understood the full implications of the document that he signed and gave to the captain.

Wakefield wrote to the company in March 1843, "I rather anticipate some difficulty with the natives." The source of the likely difficulty was simple: the chiefs Te Rauparaha and Te Rangihaeata, along with their kinsmen of Ngāti Toa, believed that they owned the land and had not been paid for it. But similar disputes had been previously settled through negotiation, and Te Rauparaha was willing to negotiate on the Wairau land. He had only controlled the area since the early 1830s, when he had defeated the previous occupants, a branch of the Rangitāne iwi, and driven them from the area.

Confrontation
In January 1843 Nohorua, the older brother of Te Rauparaha, led a delegation of chiefs to Nelson to protest about British activity in the Wairau Plains. Two months later Te Rauparaha and Te Rangihaeata arrived in Nelson, urging that the issue of the land ownership be left to Land Commissioner William Spain. Based in Wellington, he had begun investigating all the claimed purchases of the New Zealand Company. Spain later wrote that during that visit, Arthur Wakefield "wished to make them a payment for the Wairau, but they positively refused to sell it, and told him they would never consent to part from it." Arthur Wakefield rejected the request to wait for Spain's enquiry, informing Te Rauparaha that if local Māori interfered with company surveyors on the land, he would lead 300 constables to arrest him. Wakefield duly despatched three parties of surveyors to the land. They were promptly warned off by local Māori, who damaged the surveyors' tools but left the men unharmed.

Te Rauparaha and Nohorua wrote to Spain on 12 May, urgently asking him to travel to the South Island to settle the company's claim to Wairau. Spain replied that he would do so when his business in Wellington was complete. A month later, with still no sign of Spain, Te Rauparaha led a party to Wairau, where they destroyed all the surveyors' equipment and shelters that had been made with products of the land. They burned down roughly-built thatched huts that contained surveying equipment. The surveyors were rounded up and sent unharmed back to Nelson.

Bolstered by a report in the Nelson Examiner newspaper of "Outrages by the Maori at Wairoo", Wakefield assembled a party of men, including Police Magistrate and Native Protector Henry Augustus Thompson, magistrate Captain R. England, Crown prosecutor and newspaper editor G.R. Richardson and about 50 men press-ganged into service, swearing them in as special constables. Thompson issued a warrant for the arrest for arson of Te Rauparaha and Te Rangihaeata. Wakefield referred to the chiefs in a letter as a pair of "traveling bullies".

Thompson commandeered the government brig, which was in Nelson at the time. On the morning of 17 June the party, its size swelled to between 49 and 60 men, including chief surveyor Frederick Tuckett and others who had joined the party after landing, approached the Māori camp. The New Zealand Company's storekeeper James Howard issued the British men with cutlasses, bayonets, pistols and muskets. At the path on the other side of a stream, Te Rauparaha stood surrounded by about 90 warriors, as well as by women and children. He allowed Thompson and five other men to approach him, but requested the rest of the British party to remain on their side of the stream.

Thompson refused to shake hands with Te Rauparaha and said that he had come to arrest him, not over the land issue but for burning the huts. Te Rauparaha replied that the huts had been made from rushes grown on his own land, and thus he had burnt his own property. Thompson insisted on arresting Te Rauparaha, produced a pair of handcuffs, and called out to the men on the far side of the stream, ordering them to fix bayonets and advance.  As they began to cross, one of the British fired a shot (apparently by accident). Te Rangihaeata's wife Rongo was killed in one of the first volleys, sparking gunfire from both sides. The British retreated across the stream, scrambling up the hill under fire from the Ngāti Toa. Several people from both sides were killed.

Te Rauparaha ordered the Ngāti Toa warriors to cross the stream in pursuit. Those British who had not escaped were quickly overtaken. Wakefield called for a ceasefire and surrendered, along with Thompson, Richardson and ten others. The Maori killed two of the British immediately. Te Rangihaeata demanded utu (revenge) for the death of his wife Rongo, who was also Te Rauparaha's daughter. The Maori killed all the remaining captives, including Thompson, Samuel Cottrell, a member of the original survey team; interpreter John Brooks, and Captain Wakefield. Four Māori died and three were wounded in the incident. The British lost 22 dead and five wounded.

Some survivors fled to Nelson to raise the alarm and a search party, including Wellington magistrates and a group of sailors, returned to Wairau and buried the bodies where they were found. Thirteen were put in one grave and the rest were buried in smaller groups.

Historian Michael Belgrave described the British attempt to survey the land as illegal, inopportune and ultimately disastrous.

Aftermath
Reverberations of a reported massacre were felt as far away as England, where the New Zealand Company was almost ruined by the news of "British citizens being murdered by barbarous natives". Land sales almost halted, and it became obvious the company was being less than honest in its land purchasing tactics, and reports on the events in local newspapers were far from accurate.

In the Nelson area, settlers became increasingly nervous. One group sent a deputation to the Government complaining that those who had died had been discharging their "duty as magistrates and British subjects ... the persons by whom they were killed are murderers in the eyes of common sense and justice".

In late January or early February 1844, a month after taking up his post, incoming Governor Robert FitzRoy visited Wellington and Nelson in a bid to quell the hostility between Māori and British, particularly in the wake of the Wairau Affray. So many conflicting statements had been published that it was impossible for him to decide who had been at fault. But he immediately upbraided New Zealand Company representatives and the editor of a Wellington newspaper, The New Zealand Gazette, for their aggressive attitude towards Māori, warning that he would ensure that "not an acre, not an inch of land belonging to the natives shall be touched without their consent".

He also demanded the resignation of the surviving magistrates who had issued the arrest warrants for the Māori chiefs. "'Arson,' said the Governor, 'is burning another man's house, it is not arson to burn your own house. The natives had never sold the Wairau, the hut which was burned was built on ground which belonged to the natives, and of materials which belonged to them also; consequently no arson was committed and therefore the warrant was illegal.'"

From Nelson, FitzRoy and his officials sailed to Waikanae in the North Island, where he conducted a one-man inquiry into the incident. He opened proceedings by telling a meeting of 500 Māori: 
"When I first heard of the   Wairau massacre ... I was exceedingly angry ... My first thought was to revenge the deaths of my friends, and the other Pākehā who had been killed, and for that purpose to bring many ships of war ... with many soldiers; and had I done so, you would have been sacrificed and your pa destroyed. But when I considered, I saw that the Pakeha had in the first instance been very much to blame; and I determined to come down and inquire into all the circumstances and see who was really in the wrong."

Te Rauparaha, Te Rangihaeata and other Māori present were invited to recount their version of events, while FitzRoy took notes and interrupted with further questions. He concluded the meeting by addressing the gathering again, to announce he had made his decision: "In the first place, the white men were in the wrong. They had no right to survey the land ... they had no right to build the houses on the land. As they were, then, first in the wrong, I will not avenge their deaths."

But FitzRoy, who had a background as a humanitarian, told the chiefs they had committed "a horrible crime, in murdering men who had surrendered themselves in reliance on your honour as chiefs. White men never kill their prisoners". He urged British and Māori to live peaceably, with no more bloodshed.

Settlers and the New Zealand Company were incensed by the Governor's finding, but it had been both prudent and pragmatic; Māori outnumbered settlers 900 to one. Many iwi had been amassing weapons for decades, giving them the capacity to annihilate settlements in the Wellington and Nelson areas. FitzRoy knew it was highly improbable that troops would be despatched by the British Government to wage war on the Māori or defend the settlers. FitzRoy's report was endorsed by Colonial Secretary Lord Stanley, who said the actions of the party led by Thompson and Wakefield had been "manifestly illegal, unjust and unwise", and that their deaths had occurred as a "natural and immediate sequence". William Williams, a leading Church Missionary Society missionary, also clearly apportioned blame to "our countrymen, who began with much indiscretion & gave much provocation to the natives".

The effect of the massacre and the passive reaction of FitzRoy set in train a chain of events that still rumble through the New Zealand courts today. Its immediate effect was to alarm settlers in New Plymouth, who had insecure title to land purchased under similar circumstances to Wairau. FitzRoy was very unpopular and was recalled to be replaced by Governor George Grey.

Author Ranginui Walker has claimed the arrest was delayed punishment for the Wairau killings. The Ngāti Toa iwi sold the Wairau land while Te Rauparaha was held in captivity. After his release, Te Rauparaha returned to the Wairau Valley and was there during the 1848 earthquake.

This rohe (area) has been the subject of a lengthy but successful land/compensation claim by the original Rangitane iwi, which had been displaced in the 1820s by Te Rauparaha's heke. The Rangitāne iwi are recognised as the tangata whenua (people of the land). In 1944 a government investigation established that the Wairau land had never been legally sold to the settlers. Compensation of some $2 million is to be paid by the government of New Zealand.

Memorial
In 1869 the Nelson community erected a memorial at Tuamarina Cemetery to commemorate the European casualties of the incident, with their names and the occupations listed on the inscription. The plaque had to be replaced shortly after when numerous spelling errors were discovered.

References

Further reading
 
 
 
 
 
 
 
 
 
 
 
 
 

Conflicts in 1843
Treaty of Waitangi
New Zealand Wars
Massacres in New Zealand
1843 in New Zealand
History of the Marlborough Region
June 1843 events
Massacres in 1843